Highland Park station is an at-grade light rail station on the L Line of the Los Angeles Metro Rail system. It is located at the intersection of North Avenue 57 at Marmion Way (one block north of North Figueroa Street) in the Highland Park neighborhood of Los Angeles, after which the station is named. The station opened on July 26, 2003, as part of the original Gold Line, then known as the "Pasadena Metro Blue Line" project. This station and all the other original and Foothill Extension stations will be part of the A Line upon completion of the Regional Connector project in 2023.

The station features an architectural sculpture, called 'Stone Tree Inverted Post (Bound Water Light),' created by artist Jud Fine.

During the construction and planning stages, Highland Park station was originally planned to be named Avenue 57 station, named for nearby Avenue 57. It was one of three stations to be renamed shortly before the line's opening.

The original Highland Park station and freight depot, for the Atchison, Topeka and Santa Fe railroad, was demolished in 1965.

Service

Station layout

Hours and frequency

Connections 
, the following connections are available:
LADOT DASH: Highland Park/Eagle Rock

Nearby landmarks 
 Abbey San Encino
 Arroyo Seco Regional Library 
 Highland Park Recreation Center
 Highland Theater
 L.A. Police Historical Museum
 Occidental College (in neighboring Eagle Rock)

Additional images

References

L Line (Los Angeles Metro) stations
Highland Park, Los Angeles
Northeast Los Angeles
Railway stations in the United States opened in 2003
2003 establishments in California
Former Atchison, Topeka and Santa Fe Railway stations in California
Railway stations in the United States opened in 1911
Railway stations closed in 1965